Merchant Class Ships is a 1982 role-playing game supplement for Traveller published by FASA.

Contents
Merchant Class Ships is a set of ship plans that fully depicts six different 1,000-ton merchant vessels.

Publication history
Merchant Class Ships was written by Ross Babcock, J. Andrew Keith, and Jordan Weisman and was published in 1981 by FASA as a boxed set containing a 16-page pamphlet, three large map sheets, and counters; it was published again in 1986 by Seeker as a pamphlet, three large map sheets, and counters.

Reception
William A. Barton reviewed Merchant Class Ships in The Space Gamer No. 58. Barton commented that "For the merchant-minded Traveller, Merchant Class Ships is a worthwhile investment, and, with the minor exception of the box weight, I can give it my highest recommendation."

Bob McWilliams reviewed Merchant Class Ships for White Dwarf #36, giving it an overall rating of 8 out of 10 for the novice, and 7 for the expert, and stated that "the plans themselves and the supporting material show continuing improvement over past efforts from the company."

References

Role-playing game supplements introduced in 1982
Traveller (role-playing game) supplements